The United States Secret Service Uniformed Division (USSS UD) is the Federal police force of the U.S. Secret Service, similar to the U.S. Capitol Police or DHS Federal Protective Service. It is in charge of protecting the physical White House grounds and foreign diplomatic missions in the District of Columbia area.

History

Established in 1922 as the White House Police, this organization was fully integrated into the Secret Service in 1930. In 1970, the protection of foreign diplomatic missions was added to the force's responsibilities, and its name was changed to the Executive Protective Service. The name United States Secret Service Uniformed Division was adopted in 1977.

With more than 1,300 officers as of 2010, the Uniformed Division is responsible for security at the White House Complex; the vice president's residence; the Department of the Treasury (as part of the White House Complex); and foreign diplomatic missions in the District of Columbia, area. Uniformed Division officers carry out their protective responsibilities through a network of fixed security posts, foot, bicycle, vehicular and motorcycle patrols.

Organization

The Uniformed Division has three branches: the White House Branch, the Foreign Missions Branch, and the Naval Observatory Branch. Together they provide protection for the following: the president, vice president, and their immediate families; presidential candidates; the White House Complex; the Vice President's Residence; the main Treasury Department building and its annex facility; and foreign diplomatic missions in the Washington, D.C., metropolitan area.

Officers are responsible for providing additional support to the Secret Service's protective mission through the following special support groups:

 Counter Sniper Team (CS) Created in 1971, the Counter Sniper Team's purpose is to provide specialized protective support to defend against long-range threats to Secret Service protectees.
 Canine Explosives Detection Unit (K-9) Created in 1976, the mission of the K-9 unit is to provide skilled and specialized explosives detection support to protective efforts involving Secret Service protectees.
 Emergency Response Team (ERT) Formed in 1992, ERT's primary mission is to provide tactical response to unlawful intrusions and other protective challenges related to the White House and its grounds. ERT personnel receive specialized, advanced training and must maintain a high level of physical and operational proficiency.

Officers assigned to CS, ERT, and K9, are designated "Technicians" to recognize their advanced training. Today these units are part of the agency's Special Operations Division.

The Magnetometer Support Unit: Formed to ensure that all persons entering secure areas occupied by Secret Service protectees are unarmed, the Secret Service began relying on magnetometer (metal detector) support by Uniformed Division officers to augment its protective efforts away from the White House following the attempt to assassinate President Ronald Reagan.

The Secret Service Uniformed Division's statutory authority is set out in Title 18, §3056A of the U.S. Code.

Ranks
Uniformed Division ranks, set out in the salary schedule in Title 5, § 10203 of the United States Code, are as follows:

 Chief
 Assistant Chief
 Deputy Chief
 Inspector
 Captain
 Lieutenant
 Sergeant
 Officer

Current weapons

Like all other agents, the standard sidearm for the Uniformed Division is the SIG Sauer P229 (SIG Sauer P226) in .357 SIG. Officers are trained on standard shoulder weapons that include the FN P90 submachine gun, the 9mm Heckler & Koch MP5 submachine gun, and the 12-gauge Remington 870 shotgun. The continued use of the MP5 remains a source of controversy as many other federal agencies have moved away from submachine guns altogether and replaced them with automatic rifles.

As a non-lethal option, Special Agents, Special Officers, and Uniformed Division Officers are armed with the ASP 16” expandable  baton, and Uniformed Division officers also carry pepper spray.

Units assigned to the Special Operations Division carry a variety of non-standard weapons. The Counter Assault Team (CAT) and the Emergency Response Team (ERT) are both issued the 5.56mm Knight's Armament Company SR-16 CQB rifle. CAT also uses 12-gauge Remington 870 MCS breaching shotguns.

Uniformed Division technicians assigned to the Counter Sniper (CS) team use custom built .300 Winchester Magnum-chambered bolt-action rifles referred to as JARs ("Just Another Rifle"). These rifles use Remington 700 actions in Accuracy International stocks with Schmidt & Bender optics. CS technicians also use the 7.62mm KAC SR-25/Mk11 Mod 0 semi-automatic sniper rifle with a Trijicon 5.5× ACOG optic.

References

External links

United States Secret Service
Law enforcement agencies of the District of Columbia